Bruno Friesenbichler (born 30 March 1968) is an Austrian football manager and former player who played as a striker.

He is the father of footballers Kevin Friesenbichler and Robin Friesenbichler, and the brother of retired footballer Günter Friesenbichler.

Honours
 Austrian Cup: 2000-01
 Austrian Football First League: 1998-99, 2000–01

External links
 

1968 births
Living people
Austrian footballers
Association football forwards
First Vienna FC players
FC Kärnten players
Grazer AK players
SK Sturm Graz players
SW Bregenz players
FC Lustenau players
DSV Leoben players
SV Ried players
Austrian football managers
TSV Hartberg managers
SK Austria Klagenfurt managers